Gordon Hale Lewis (born 23 June 1936) is a Welsh former rugby union, and professional rugby league footballer who played in the 1950s, 1960s and 1970s.

Background
Gordon Lewis was born in Mynydd-y-Garreg, Wales

Playing career

International honours
Gordon Lewis won caps for Wales (RL) while at Leigh in 1959 against France, in 1963 against France, in 1969 against France, and in 1970 against France, and England, won a cap for Great Britain (RL) while at Leigh in 1965 against New Zealand, and represented Other Nationalities (RL) while at Leigh, he played left- in the 2-19 defeat by St. Helens at Knowsley Road, St. Helens on Wednesday 27 January 1965, to mark the switching-on of new floodlights.

County Cup Final appearances
Gordon Lewis played right-, i.e. number 3, in Leigh's 4-15 defeat by St. Helens in the 1963–64 Lancashire County Cup Final during the 1963–64 season at Knowsley Road, St. Helens on Saturday 26 October 1963.

BBC2 Floodlit Trophy Final appearances
Gordon Lewis played right-, i.e. number 3, in Leigh's 5-8 defeat by Castleford in the 1967 BBC2 Floodlit Trophy Final during the 1967–68 season at Headingley Rugby Stadium, Leeds on Saturday 16 January 1968.

Personal
Gordon lives in Leigh (Wigan) with his wife Pamela. They have two children; Anne and Anthony, and four grandchildren; Samantha, Matthew, Alexandra and Francesca.

References

External links
!Great Britain Statistics at englandrl.co.uk (statistics currently missing due to not having appeared for both Great Britain, and England)
Team – Past Players – L at swansearfc.co.uk 
Profile at swansearfc.co.uk

1939 births
Living people
Great Britain national rugby league team players
Leigh Leopards captains
Leigh Leopards players
Other Nationalities rugby league team players
Rugby league centres
Rugby league players from Carmarthenshire
Rugby union players from Kidwelly
Swansea RFC players
Swinton Lions players
Wales national rugby league team captains
Wales national rugby league team players
Welsh rugby league players
Welsh rugby union players